Manuel Flores Sánchez (born 23 July 1951) is a Spanish basketball player. He competed in the men's tournament at the 1980 Summer Olympics.

References

External links
 

1951 births
Living people
Spanish men's basketball players
1974 FIBA World Championship players
Olympic basketball players of Spain
Basketball players at the 1980 Summer Olympics
People from Mérida, Spain
Sportspeople from the Province of Badajoz